Suzhou Experimental High School, officially the Suzhou Experimental High School of Jiangsu Province  is located in Suzhou, Jiangsu Province, China. It was founded in 1994, have taken the official name of "Nanjing University Affiliated High School in Suzhou" since 1996. The school become the key high schools in Jiangsu province in 1996. The school has modern teaching equipment, and was rebuilt in 2016. It has more than 1600 students and 160 faculty.

References 

High schools in Suzhou